The Odsal Tudors or Bradford Tudors were a motorcycle speedway team based at Odsal Stadium in Bradford from 1950 to 1960.

History
At the end of July 1950 the Odsal Tudors replaced the Odsal Boomerangs. At the time it was said that the name change was due to the riders hating the Boomerang nickname, or maybe they believed that a change of name would herald a change of fortune following the events of 1 July. On 1 July 1950, 47-year-old Joe Abbott was killed instantly following a crash at Odsal Stadium in a league match against West Ham Hammers. After falling and hitting the safety fence he was hit by a rider behind. A second rider was killed on the same night in a division 2 fixture.

The Tudors of 1951 repeated the feat of the Boomerangs of 1948 and finished bottom of the National League.

One bright spot was Arthur Forrest, a local rider who was the product of the Monday night training school, finished third in the 1956 world final. With the decreasing attendances it was not a surprise that at the end of the 1956 season that it was announced that league racing would not be staged at Odsal in 1957.

In 1957 former riders Oliver Hart, Ron Clarke and Ron Mason took over as promoters and staged a number of open meetings and when in August, the Birmingham Brummies withdrew from the National League as a result of internal speedway politics, Clarke and Mason took over their remaining fixtures riding as the Bradford (the Odsal name was dropped) Tudors.

Season summary

Notable riders
Al Allison
Guy Allott
Jack Biggs
Nigel Boocock
Ron Clarke
Arthur Forrest
Oliver Hart
Jack Hughes
Dent Oliver
Eddie Rigg
Arthur Wright

See also
 Odsal Boomerangs
 Bradford Panthers
 Bradford Northern (speedway)
 Bradford Barons
 Bradford Dukes

References

Sport in Bradford
Defunct British speedway teams